Best of 00–10 is a greatest hits album by English electronic music band Ladytron. It was released on 28 March 2011 by Nettwerk. The compilation includes remastered material spanning from the band's previous studio albums, as well as two previously unreleased tracks—lead single "Ace of Hz" and a cover version of Death in June's 1992 song "Little Black Angel". A deluxe version was also released, featuring a bonus disc of 16 additional tracks and an 80-page photo booklet.

Track listing

Best of Remixes
On 8 March 2011, a preceding companion compilation titled Best of Remixes was released digitally.

Singles  

"Ace of Hz", one of the two new tracks to appear on Best of 00–10, was released as a single several months prior on 30 November 2010. It also featured on the soundtrack for FIFA 11. and was later included on the subsequent (non-compilation) studio album, Gravity the Seducer.

On 12 January 2011, remixed versions of the song appeared in a digitally distributed EP released by Nettwerk.

Ace of Hz single track listing

References

External links
 

2011 greatest hits albums
Albums produced by Jim Abbiss
Albums produced by Mickey Petralia
Ladytron albums
Nettwerk Records compilation albums